Yang Yanyin (born December 1947) is a Chinese politician. She currently serves as the executive vice secretary of the Work Committee of the Central Government Departments of the Central Committee of the Chinese Communist Party.

Born in Xintai, Shandong Province, Yang joined the Chinese Communist Party (CCP) in 1971, and graduated from the department of economics of Shandong University, majoring in management. She formerly served in a textile mill in Pingyin County, as vice Party chief of Pingyin, and as vice director of the personnel bureau of Shandong. Beginning in 1983, she served as a standing committee member of the CCP Shandong committee, vice director of the organization department of Shandong, and the chairperson of the Shandong Women's Association. In February 1990, Yang was elevated to a secretary of the secretariat of the All-China Women's Federation. In December 1990, she became the vice president of the Federation. She was elected to be a standing committee member of the 8th National People's Congress in March, 1993.

In July, 1993, Yang was appointed vice Minister of Civil Affairs. Since November 2004, Yang has served as the executive vice secretary of the Work Committee of the Central Government Departments of the CCP Central Committee.

She is a current member of the 17th Central Committee of the Chinese Communist Party.

External links
Listen to the citizens, and control them.
Social security in the People's Republic of China, The minimum living standard guarantee system for urban residents in China
List of members of the 17th CPC Central Committee

Living people
1947 births
Members of the Standing Committee of the 8th National People's Congress
Members of the 17th Central Committee of the Chinese Communist Party
Chinese Communist Party politicians from Shandong
People's Republic of China politicians from Shandong
Politicians from Tai'an
All-China Women's Federation people